Michael Eugene Lester (born March 3, 1955) is an American conservative editorial cartoonist and artist who has worked as a children's book illustrator. He is also the creator of the syndicated comic strip Mike du Jour which launched in 2012. His editorial cartoons and his comic strip are both syndicated by The Washington Post Writers Group. He has received National Cartoonists Society awards multiple times.

In May 2009, Lester received the Reuben Award from the National Cartoonists Society for his work on the children's book Cool Daddy Rat.

He was born in Atlanta, Georgia.

External links 
Mike Lester's Webpage
Mike Lester at Washington Post Writers Group
Mike Lester at Cagle Cartoons

References

1955 births
Living people
American editorial cartoonists
Artists from Atlanta
Reuben Award winners